Yuet Wah College (abbr: YWC), often referred to as Yuet Wah, is a Macau all-boys Catholic preschool through secondary school in São Lázaro (St. Lazarus Parish), Macau. It was founded in 1925, making it one of the oldest secondary schools in Macau. It is accredited by the Salesians of Don Bosco.

The school aims to provide a liberal education based on Catholic principles; its students are encouraged to be well-rounded.  School teams participate in various inter-school sports and music competitions.
In 2001, a primary school division was opened on Colégio Dom Bosco (Yuet Wah) campus.

Yuet Wah College has a long list of notable alumni, including entrepreneurs, politicians, musicians, actors, four members of the Macau Executive Council and two members of the Macau cabinet.

History
Yuet Wah College was founded in 1925 in Canton, China. The school, which is run by the Salesians of Don Bosco, aims at giving the students a complete and balanced education in its moral, intellectual, social and physical aspects.

Curriculum

Yuet Wah College prepare students for the JAEM Examination and International A-levels as well as IGCSE.

Facilities
 
Covered Playground
Gym Room
Taekwondo Room
Hall
Jubilee Staff Room
Toilets
 
Classrooms
Priest's Dormitory
School Office
General Office
Principal's Room
Admission Counseling Room
Library
Stationery Shop
Religious Activity Room
Salesian Youth Room
Small Chapel
School Supervisor's Room
Meeting Room
Dominic Canteen
Dominic Music Room
Dominic Art Room
Toilets
Communication Office
 
Small Hall
Classrooms
Rinaldi Music Room
Rinaldi Art Room
Electric Laboratory
Toilets
 
Computer Rooms
Physical Laboratory
Chemical Laboratory
Social Worker's Room
First Aids' Room
Student Union's Room
PE Room
Toilets
 
Chapel
Bosco Staff Room
Rinaldi Canteen
Orchestra's Room
Meeting Room
Toilets
Table Tennis Room

Notable alumni and staff
António Ng Kuok Cheong (member in the Macau Legislative Assembly)
Cheong Kuoc Vá (Secretary for Security of Macau)
Lau Si Io (Secretariat for Transport and Public Works of Macau)
Kuan Hsin-chi (chairman of the Hong Kong Civic Party)
Chan Wai Chi (chairman of the New Democratic Macau Association)
Ao Man-long (Secretary for Transport and Public Works of Macau)
Alex Fong Chung-Sun (famous actor from Hong Kong)
Julio Acconci (member of the HK-based band Soler)
Dino Acconci (member of the HK-based band Soler)
Steven Lo (businessman active in Hong Kong and Macau entertainment world. Current chairman of the Football Management Committee of South China Athletic Association.)
Pak Hou Chau (founder and CEO of WOW App Inc., Breakthrough Advertisement Limited and ISG Discount App)

See also

 Chan Sui Ki Perpetual Help College

References

External links
 

Catholic secondary schools in Macau
Educational institutions established in 1925
1920s establishments in Macau